The Terror of the Red Mill is a 1921 German silent film directed by Carl Boese and starring Aud Egede-Nissen, Otto Gebühr, and Alfred Abel.

Cast

References

Bibliography

External links

1921 films
Films of the Weimar Republic
German silent feature films
Films directed by Carl Boese
German black-and-white films
1920s German films